The 1897 St. Viateur football team was an American football team that represented St. Viateur College in the 1897 college football season. The team compiled a 3–1 record and outscored their opponents by a total of 68 to 64.

Schedule

Roster
 Brennock, left end
 Kearney, left tackle
 Legris, left guard
 Armstrong, center
 Hawkins, right guard
 Deford, right tackle
 Paterson, right end
 Moore, left halfback
 Daniher, right halfback
 Quill, quarterback
 Walsh (captain), fullback

Game summary

A game summary in the Daily Inter Ocean stated the contest was dull, uninteresting, and featureless.  The article exclaimed, "at no stage of the game was Notre Dame's goal line in danger."  One positive point mentioned by the newspaper was for St. Viateur's exemplary tackling.

References

St. Viateur
St. Viator Irish football seasons
St. Viateur football